D. Antonio Bridges II (born January 21, 1977) is an American politician who currently serves in the Maryland House of Delegates. Delegate Bridges represents the 41st Legislative District of the state of Maryland which is located in west Baltimore City.

Early life and career
Bridges was born in Baltimore, Maryland on January 21, 1977. He attended the Baltimore Polytechnic Institute and Frostburg State University, where he earned a B.A. degree in mass communications in 2000, and Towson University, where he received a certificate in communications and strategic public relations in 2002. After graduating from Towson, Bridges worked at the Mayor's Office of Neighborhoods and Constituent Services in Baltimore City, for which he eventually became the Executive Director in 2007.

Afterwards, he served as the Chief of Staff for the Governor's Office of Community Initiatives until 2013. He has also served as a senior advisor for the Maryland Department of Transportation and as the Chief of Staff for the Maryland Transit Administration. In 2017, the Park Heights Renaissance named Bridges as its Director of Human Services and Operations.

In the legislature
Bridges was sworn into the Maryland House of Delegates on January 9, 2019.

Committee assignments
 Appropriations Committee, 2019–present (transportation & the environment subcommittee, 2020; oversight committee on personnel, 2020; education & economic development subcommittee, 2021–present; vice-chair, oversight committee on pensions, 2021–present)
 Study Group on Economic Stability, 2019–present
 Environment and Transportation Committee, 2019 (environment subcommittee, 2019; motor vehicle & transportation subcommittee, 2019)

Other memberships
 Legislative Black Caucus of Maryland, 2019–present
 Maryland Legislative Transit Caucus, 2019–present

Electoral history

References

African-American state legislators in Maryland
21st-century American politicians
Democratic Party members of the Maryland House of Delegates
Living people
Baltimore Polytechnic Institute alumni
Frostburg State University alumni
Towson University alumni
1977 births
21st-century African-American politicians
20th-century African-American people